Trichoscypha acuminata, commonly called amvout, is a species of plant in the family Anacardiaceae. It is found in Nigeria, Cameroon, Equatorial Guinea, Central African Republic, Gabon, the Congos and Angola. Mature trees reach 20m in height and leaves are up to 1.5m long. Its natural habitat is rain forest. Fruits are dark red and edible.

References

acuminata
Taxonomy articles created by Polbot
Taxa named by Adolf Engler
Flora of Africa
Fruits originating in Africa
Tropical fruit